

Overall

Pakistan vs Sri Lanka

West Indies vs England

Pakistan vs England

West Indies vs Sri Lanka

West Indies vs Pakistan

England vs Sri Lanka

England vs Pakistan

West Indies vs Sri Lanka

Pakistan vs Sri Lanka

England vs West Indies

Sri Lanka vs England

West Indies vs Pakistan

References

External links
 Cricket World Cup 1987 from Cricinfo

1987 Cricket World Cup
1987 in cricket